Mythimna martoni is a moth in the family Noctuidae. It is found in Taiwan, China and India.

References

Moths described in 2001
Moths of Asia
Mythimna (moth)